Japan competed at the 2017 World Aquatics Championships in Budapest, Hungary from 14 July to 30 July.

Medalists

Diving

Japan has entered 5 divers (two male and three female).

Men

Women

Mixed

Open water swimming

Japan has entered six open water swimmers

Swimming

Japanese swimmers have achieved qualifying standards in the following events (up to a maximum of 2 swimmers in each event at the A-standard entry time, and 1 at the B-standard):

Men

Women

Mixed

Synchronized swimming

Japan's synchronized swimming team consisted of 14 athletes (1 male and 13 female).

Women

Mixed

 Legend: (R) = Reserve Athlete

Water polo

Japan qualified both a men's and women's teams.

Men's tournament

Team roster

Katsuyuki Tanamura
Seiya Adachi
Shuma Kawamoto
Mitsuaki Shiga
Takuma Yoshida
Atsuto Iida
Yusuke Shimizu (C)
Mitsuru Takata
Atsushi Arai
Kohei Inaba
Keigo Okawa
Kenya Araki
Tomoyoshi Fukushima

Group play

Playoffs

9th–12th place semifinals

Ninth place game

Women's tournament

Team roster

Miyuu Aoki
Yumi Arima
Yuri Kazama
Shino Magariyama
Chiaki Sakanoue
Minori Yamamoto
Akari Inaba
Yuki Niizawa
Kana Hosoya
Misaki Noro
Marina Tokumoto
Kotori Suzuki (C)
Minami Shioya

Group play

13th–16th place semifinals

13th place game

References

Nations at the 2017 World Aquatics Championships
Japan at the World Aquatics Championships
2017 in Japanese sport